Cherami Leigh (born July 19, 1988) is an American actress. She has provided voices for a number of English-language versions of anime series and video games with Funimation, Bang Zoom! Entertainment, NYAV Post, Studiopolis and Viz Media. Some of her roles include Kazari Uiharu in A Certain Magical Index and A Certain Scientific Railgun series, Yoshika Miyafuji in Strike Witches, Eucliwood Hellscythe in Is This a Zombie, Mutsuki in KanColle: Kantai Collection, Aisa in One Piece, Mika Shimotsuki in Psycho-Pass, Shijima Kurookano in Nabari no Ou, Hibiki in Sekirei, Elizabeth Midford in Black Butler, Road Kamelot in D.Gray-man, Sae Kashiwagi in Peach Girl, Tamaki Kawazoe in Bamboo Blade, Patty Thompson in Soul Eater, Lucy Heartfilia in Fairy Tail, Cecily Campbell in The Sacred Blacksmith, Asuna Yuuki in Sword Art Online, Sailor Venus in the Viz Media dub of Sailor Moon, Plutia / Iris Heart in Hyperdimension Neptunia, Sarada Uchiha in Boruto: Naruto Next Generations and Chloe Cerise in Pokémon Journeys: The Series.

On screen, she played a young LeAnn Rimes in Holiday in Your Heart and has appeared on Bones, Friday Night Lights, Longmire and Shameless. In video games, she voices Rottytops in the Shantae series, Gaige the Mechromancer in the Borderlands series, Arianrhod in The Legend of Heroes: Trails of Cold Steel IV, Minerva in The Walking Dead: The Final Season, Rhea in Fire Emblem: Three Houses, Makoto Niijima in Persona 5 and the Female V in Cyberpunk 2077 for which she was nominated for a BAFTA Award for Performer in a Leading Role.

Biography
Leigh was born on July 19, 1988. She began acting at the age of six. Leigh studied the Meisner technique with Nancy Chartier from the age of nine. As a child actress, she played Gretchen in Finding North, Marcia in Temple Grandin, young LeAnn Rimes in Holiday in Your Heart, Stacy Anderson in The President's Man and appeared on Walker, Texas Ranger multiple times. She attended Hebron High School in Carrollton. She studied theater at Collin College in Plano, Texas. She also worked for Radio Disney as a DJ with voice-over promotions and commercials for ABC Radio for 10 years. In 2013, she moved to Los Angeles where she continued voice-work and began taking on live-action roles.

Personal life
Leigh married fellow actor Jon Christie on April 13, 2014, whom she had dated since 2010.

Filmography

Voice acting

Anime

Animation

Film

Other dubbing

Video games

Television

Live-action

Film

Awards and nominations

References

External links
 
 
 
 
 
 Cherami Leigh at CrystalAcids Anime Voice Actor Database
 

1988 births
Living people
Actresses from Dallas
Actresses from Los Angeles
American child actresses
American film actresses
American radio personalities
American television actresses
American video game actresses
American voice actresses
Place of birth missing (living people)
People from Carrollton, Texas
Radio Disney DJs
Radio personalities from Dallas
American women radio presenters
20th-century American actresses
21st-century American actresses